Martin Erasmus is a South African freestyle wrestler. He won the gold medal in the men's 97 kg event at the 2018 Commonwealth Games held in Gold Coast, Australia.

At the 2018 African Wrestling Championships held in Port Harcourt, Nigeria, he won the gold medal in the men's freestyle 97 kg event. He also won the silver medal in this competition at the African Wrestling Championships in 2015, 2016, 2017 and 2020.

In 2021, he competed at the African & Oceania Olympic Qualification Tournament hoping to qualify for the 2020 Summer Olympics in Tokyo, Japan.

References

External links 
 

Living people
Year of birth missing (living people)
Place of birth missing (living people)
South African male sport wrestlers
Wrestlers at the 2018 Commonwealth Games
Commonwealth Games medallists in wrestling
Commonwealth Games gold medallists for South Africa
African Wrestling Championships medalists
Medallists at the 2018 Commonwealth Games